Agonopterix coenosella is a moth in the family Depressariidae. It was described by Zerny in 1940. It is found in Turkmenistan and Tajikistan.

References

Moths described in 1940
Agonopterix
Moths of Asia